Stephen Pollington is an English author who specialises in Anglo-Saxon England and the Old English language who has written a number of books on the subject, most of which have been published by the company Anglo-Saxon Books.

In 2010, Pollington co-authored Wayland's Work: Anglo-Saxon Art, Myth and Material Culture 4th-7th Century with Lindsay Kerr and Brett Hammond. It received a positive review in Antiquaries Journal for its "synthesis of current knowledge." The Council for British Archaeology's magazine British Archaeology, however, was largely critical of the use of "original research and non specialist summary."
A paper based on his keynote speech at the Cambridge conference ‘Medieval Feasting, Hospitality and Gift-Exchange’ (August 2009) was published as ‘The Mead-Hall Community’ in Journal of Medieval History Volume 37, Issue 1, March 2011.

He provided the voice of the Anglo-Saxon Chronicle for the Mayavision - BBC television series King Alfred and the Anglo Saxons in which the Chronicle entries were read in Old English.

Pollington co-authored a report on the making of a replica of the Sutton Hoo stone with Paul Mortimer and its wider implications, from which he was invited to present a paper at the Wystawa podczas konferencji archeologicznej w Bytowie in September 2014 (proceedings forthcoming).

Publications

Notes

References
Academic books

Further reading

English historians
Living people
Year of birth missing (living people)